Zofia Weigl‎‎‎ (née Kulikowska; c. 1885–1940) was a Polish biologist.

Kulikowska obtained the doctor of biology, then became an associate professor and began scientific collaboration with Rudolf Weigl (inventor of the world's first effective vaccine against typhus).‎‎ They married in 1921. Zofia became one of his closest collaborators at the Institute for Typhus and Virus Research.‎‎ Like other members of her family, she was one of the first ‎lice feeders.

References 

University of Lviv alumni
1880s births
1940 deaths
Polish biologists
Polish schoolteachers